Denis Atkins (8 November 1938 – 13 September 2016) was a professional English footballer who played as a defender for Huddersfield Town and Bradford City during his 12-year career between 1959 and 1971.

References

Sources

1938 births
2016 deaths
English footballers
Association football fullbacks
Huddersfield Town A.F.C. players
Bradford City A.F.C. players
English Football League players
Footballers from Bradford